This is a list of the All-Russian Constituent Assembly members, elected in 1917.

Archival materials and literature
Per electoral law, 815 members of the Constituent Assembly should have been elected (735 from civilian constituencies, 80 from military constituencies). But 1917 Constituent Assembly election took place in midst of war and revolution, and was never carried out to completion - at the time of the sole session of the Constituent Assembly in January 1918 election results were missing from some constituencies whilst some constituencies had yet to hold a vote. In 1930 a team of Soviet historians compiled a listing of elected deputies of the Constituent Assembly, presented in the book Vserossiĭskoe uchreditelʹnoe sobranie. However, they subdivided their listing in two categories based on the level of corroboration possible - a 'general list' with 601 names (with a high degree of corroboration of different sources) and an 'additional list' with 106 names (with a lower degree of corroboration of source material).

Three key documents were used to compile the general list - a list of 499 names compiled by the office of the Electoral Commission (based on telegram reports from District Electoral Commissions), a handwritten list of 463 names of elected deputies that were registered as Constituent Assembly members (with certifications and other documents issued by District Electoral Commissions as attachments) and a list of 237 names of members of the Socialist-Revolutionary faction in the Constituent Assembly. These three sources have a high degree of overlap, except 5 names of SR deputies that only appear in the latter document. Per the authors of the 1930 work on the Constituent Assembly, they had encountered additional corroboration in archives and documents for each of the 601 deputies on the 'general list'.

Altai

 Aleksei Devizorov (Socialist Revolutionary Party)/Council of peasant deputies
 Ivan Krivorotov (Socialist Revolutionary Party)/Council of peasant deputies
 Mendel Levin (Socialist Revolutionary Party)/Council of peasant deputies
 Valentin Lomshakov (Socialist Revolutionary Party)/Council of peasant deputies
 Nikolai Liubimov (Socialist Revolutionary Party)/Council of peasant deputies
 Konstantin Ramazanov (Socialist Revolutionary Party)/Council of peasant deputies
 Yevgeniy Rogovskiy (Socialist Revolutionary Party)/Council of peasant deputies
 Vadim Rudnev (Socialist Revolutionary Party)/Council of peasant deputies
 Ivan Sotnin (Socialist Revolutionary Party)/Council of peasant deputies
 Akindin Shaposhnikov (Socialist Revolutionary Party)/Council of peasant deputies
 Daniil Shnyrev (Socialist Revolutionary Party)/Council of peasant deputies
 Pavel Kosorotov (Socialist Revolutionary Party)/Council of peasant deputies
 Mikhail Shatilov (Socialist Revolutionary Party)/Council of peasant deputies

Arkhangelsk

 Aleksei Ivanov (Socialist Revolutionary Party)/Council of peasant deputies
 Mikhail Kviatkovskiy (Socialist Revolutionary Party)/Council of peasant deputies

Astrakhan

 Ivan Nezhintsev (Socialist Revolutionary Party)/Council of peasant deputies
 Kuzma Tereschenko (Socialist Revolutionary Party)/Council of peasant deputies
 Aleksandr Trusov (Bolsheviks)
 Fatikh Usmanov (Muslim)
 Vera Figner (Socialist Revolutionary Party)/Council of peasant deputies

Bessarabia

 Aleksandr Aleksandrov (Socialist Revolutionary Party)
 Ion Inculeț Council of peasant deputies
 Trefiliy Katoros Council of peasant deputies
 Vasiliy Rudyev Council of peasant deputies
 Mark Slonim (Socialist Revolutionary Party)
 Konstantin Sukhovykh (Socialist Revolutionary Party)
 Lev Sukhovykh (Socialist Revolutionary Party)
 Pantelimon Erhan Council of peasant deputies
 Israil Imas (Socialist Revolutionary Party)
 Feodosiy Kozhokar Council of peasant deputies
 Girsh Lurie (Mensheviks-united and Bund)
 Sergey Urusov (National Freedom)
 Boris Avilov (Internationalists)
 Yakov Bernstein-Kogan (Jewish National Electoral Committee)
 Afanasiy Mekhonoshin (Socialist Revolutionary Party)
 Hilarion Stepanov Council of peasant deputies

Caspian

 Sandzhi Bayanov

Chernigov

 Yevgenia Bosch (Bolsheviks)
 Catherine Breshkovsky (Socialist Revolutionary Party)
 Ippolit Kovalevskyi (Ukrainian Socialist Revolutionary Party, Ukrainian Peasant Union)
 Tyt Kovbasa (Ukrainian Socialist Revolutionary Party, Ukrainian Peasant Union)
 Vasyl Kostenetskyi (Ukrainian Socialist Revolutionary Party, Ukrainian Peasant Union)
 Viacheslav Lashkevych (Ukrainian Socialist Revolutionary Party, Ukrainian Peasant Union)
 Feodor Motora (Bolsheviks)
 Havrylo Odynets (Ukrainian Socialist Revolutionary Party, Ukrainian Peasant Union)
 Georgy Pyatakov (Bolsheviks)
 Adrian Ryndich (Bolsheviks)
 Mykola Sayenko (Ukrainian Socialist Revolutionary Party, Ukrainian Peasant Union)
 Mykyta Shapoval (Ukrainian Socialist Revolutionary Party, Ukrainian Peasant Union)
 Mykola Shrah (Ukrainian Socialist Revolutionary Party, Ukrainian Peasant Union)
 Andriy Kuzmenko (Ukrainian Socialist Revolutionary Party, Ukrainian Peasant Union)

Chinese Eastern Railway

 Nikolai Strelkov (Mensheviks united)

Don

 Sergei Shvetsov (Socialist Revolutionary Party)
 Pavel Ageyev (Cossacks)
 Mikhail Arakantsev (Cossacks)
 Boris Babin (Socialist Revolutionary Party)
 Mitrofan Bogayevskiy (Cossacks)
 Semeon Vasilchenko (Bolsheviks)
 Mitrofan Voronkov (Cossacks)
 Alexey Kaledin (Cossacks)
 Kuzma Kolesnikov (Socialist Revolutionary Party)
 Venedikt Kurilov (Socialist Revolutionary Party)
 Solomon Lozovsky (Bolsheviks)
 Valerian Mamonov (Socialist Revolutionary Party)
 Nikolai Melnikov (Cossacks)
 Aleksandr Nikolayev (Socialist Revolutionary Party)
 Pavel Nikolskiy (Socialist Revolutionary Party)
 Aleksei Popov (Cossacks)
 Sergey Syrtsov (Bolsheviks)
 Badma Ulanov (Cossacks)
 Vasily Kharlamov (Cossacks)

Estonia

 Jaan Anvelt (Bolsheviks)/Executive Committee of landless or small estate peasantry
 Rudolf Vakmann (Bolsheviks)/Executive Committee of landless or small estate peasantry
 Jüri Vilms (Estonian Labour Party)
 Hans Pöögelmann (Bolsheviks)/Executive Committee of landless or small estate peasantry
 Jaan Poska (Estonian Democratic bloc)
 Ivan Rabtšinski (Bolsheviks)/Executive Committee of landless or small estate peasantry
 Julius Seljamaa (Estonian Labour Party)
 Jaan Tõnisson (Estonian Democratic bloc)

Fergana

 Vadim Chaykin (All-Fergana)
 Mir Adil Mirza-Axmedov (All-Fergana)
 Mustafa Shokay (All-Fergana)
 Shax-Islam Shahiaxmedov (All-Fergana)
 Xudontbey Mahomed Urguli-Agaev (All-Fergana)
 Sarykbey Akaev (All-Fergana)
 Nasyrxan Tiuriaev (Muinil-Islam Society)
 Abdurakhmanbey Urazaev (All-Fergana)
 Kadyr Xodjaev (Muinil-Islam Society)
 Qori Yoʻldosh Poʻlatov (All-Fergana)

Horde

 Baxtigirey Kulmanov (Alash)
 Validkhan Tanachev (Alash)

Irkutsk

 Konstantin Korshunov (Socialist Revolutionary Party)/All-Russian Peasant Union
 Yevgeni Timofeyev (Socialist Revolutionary Party)/All-Russian Peasant Union
 Baerton Vampilun (Buriat Nationals)
 Nikolai Gavrilov (Social-Democrats Bolsheviks / Mensheviks-Internationalists)
 Moisei Krol (Socialist Revolutionary Party)/All-Russian Peasant Union

Kaluga

 Ivan Borodacheov (Socialist Revolutionary Party)/Council of peasant deputies
 Nikolai Glebov-Avilov (Bolsheviks)
 Boris Yeliseyev (Socialist Revolutionary Party)/Council of peasant deputies
 Peotr Zakharov (Bolsheviks)
 Pavel Logachev (Bolsheviks)
 Nikolai Parol (Socialist Revolutionary Party)/Council of peasant deputies
 Innokentiy Stukov (Bolsheviks)
 Vladimir Turov (Bolsheviks)

Kamchatka

 Konstantin Lavrov (Socialist Revolutionary Party)

Kazan

 Ilyas Alkin (Muslim Socialist list)
 Gavriil Alyunov (All-Chuvash National Congress)
 Ivan Vasilyev (All-Chuvash National Congress, Chuvash Military Committee, Chuvash SR Party)
 Mullanur Waxitov (Muslim Socialist list)
 Andrei Kolegayev (Socialist Revolutionary Party)/Council of peasant deputies
 Ilya Mayorov (Socialist Revolutionary Party)/Council of peasant deputies
 Grigoriy Martiushin (Socialist Revolutionary Party)/Council of peasant deputies
 Vasiliy Mokhov (Socialist Revolutionary Party)/Council of peasant deputies
 Semeon Nikolayev (All-Chuvash National Congress)
 Samigulla Salekhov (Muslim Assembly)
 Nikolai Sukhanov (Socialist Revolutionary Party)/Council of peasant deputies
 Nazip Khalfin (Muslim Assembly)

Kharkov

 Nikolay Alekseyev (Zemlia i Volia)
 Vasiliy Diakonov (Zemlia i Volia)
 Vladimir Karelin (Zemlia i Volia)
 Vladimir Kachinskiy (Zemlia i Volia)
 Ivan Kravchenko (Zemlia i Volia)
 Ignat Mikhailichenko (Zemlia i Volia)
 Matvei Muranov (Bolsheviks)
 Andrei Ovcharenko (Zemlia i Volia)
 Nikolai Popov (Zemlia i Volia)
 Nikolai Sviatitskiy (Zemlia i Volia)
 Afanasiy Severov-Odoyevskiy (Zemlia i Volia)
 Fyodor Sergeyev (Bolsheviks)
 Aleksandr Streltsov (Socialist Revolutionary Party)
 Nikolai Shkorbatov (Zemlia i Volia)

Kherson

 Anton Bontsarevych Council of peasant deputies
 Danylo Vekhtev Council of peasant deputies
 Illia Havrylyuk Council of peasant deputies
 Kindrat Hlevenko Council of peasant deputies
 Vsevolod Holubovych Council of peasant deputies
 Mykhailo Hordiyevskyi Council of peasant deputies
 Oscar Gruzenberg (Jewish National Bloc)
 Davyd Lvovych Council of peasant deputies
 Volodymyr Rikhter Council of peasant deputies
 Iosif Skliar (Bolsheviks)
 Petro Tryshevskyi Council of peasant deputies
 Yakiv Troichuk Council of peasant deputies
 Oleksiy Feofilaktov Council of peasant deputies
 Volodymyr Chekhivsky (Ukrainian Social Democratic Labour Party)
 Serhiy Yurytsyn Council of peasant deputies
 (Volodymyr Asmolov Council of peasant deputies)?
 Lev Velikhov (Constitutional Democratic Party)
 (Hryhoriy Yeremnchuk Council of peasant deputies)?
 (Alexander Freiherr von Meyendorff (Russian Germans))?
 Vladimir Teomkin (Jewish National Electoral Committee)

Kiev

 Volodymyr Vynnychenko (Ukrainian Social Revolutionary)
 Mykhailo Hrushevsky (Ukrainian Social Revolutionary)
 Serhiy Donchenko (Ukrainian Social Revolutionary)
 Oleksandr Ilchenko (Ukrainian Social Revolutionary)
 Yevhen Kotyk (Ukrainian Socialist Revolutionary Party, Ukrainian Peasant Union)
 Mykyta Mandryka (Ukrainian Social Revolutionary)
 Mykola Porsh (Ukrainian Social Revolutionary)
 Vasyl Prysiazhniuk (Ukrainian Social Revolutionary)
 Hryhoriy Pyrkovka (Ukrainian Social Revolutionary)
 Vasyl Rokhmaniuk (Ukrainian Social Revolutionary)
 Oleksandr Sevriuk (Ukrainian Social Revolutionary)
 Mykola Stasyuk (Ukrainian Social Revolutionary)
 Naum Syrkin (Jewish National Committee)
 Mykhailo Tkachenko (Ukrainian Social Revolutionary)
 Andriy Khomutovskyi (Ukrainian Social Revolutionary)
 Vasyl Khymeryk (Ukrainian Social Revolutionary)
 Mykola Chechel (Ukrainian Social Revolutionary)
 Fedir Shvets (Ukrainian Social Revolutionary)
 Mykhailo Darchuk (Ukrainian Socialist Revolutionary Party, Social-Democrats, Ukrainian Peasant Union)
 Antin Drahomyretskyi (Ukrainian Socialist Revolutionary Party, Social-Democrats, Ukrainian Peasant Union)
 Ippolit Fialek (Bolsheviks)

Kostroma

 Stepan Danilov (Bolsheviks)
 Nikolai Kozlov (Zemlia i Volia)
 Nikolai Kondratiev (Zemlia i Volia)
 Yuri Larin (Bolsheviks)
 Sergei Lotoshnikov (Zemlia i Volia)
 Ivan Maltsev (Zemlia i Volia)
 Dmitriy Malyutin (Bolsheviks)
 Nikolai Rastopchin (Bolsheviks)

Kursk

 Aleksandr Baryshnikov (Socialist Revolutionary Party)
 Konstantin Belorussov (Socialist Revolutionary Party)
 Aleksandr Vlasov (Socialist Revolutionary Party)
 Nikita Doroshev (Socialist Revolutionary Party)
 Feodor Kutepov (Socialist Revolutionary Party)
 Mikhail Merkulov (Socialist Revolutionary Party)
 Anatoliy Neruchev (Socialist Revolutionary Party)
 Ivan Ozemblovskiy (Bolsheviks)
 Vasiliy Pakhomov (Socialist Revolutionary Party)
 Ivan Pyanykh (Socialist Revolutionary Party)
 Pavel Romanenko (Socialist Revolutionary Party)
 Andrian Rusanov (Socialist Revolutionary Party)
 Boris Kholodov (Socialist Revolutionary Party)

Livonia

 Jan Berzin (Latvian Social Democratic Workers' Party)
 Jānis Goldmanis (All-Russian Peasant Union)
 Karl Peterson (Latvian Social Democratic Workers' Party)
 Fricis Roziņš (Latvian Social Democratic Workers' Party)

Minsk

 Ivan Alibegov (Bolsheviks)
 Julius Brutzkus (Jewish National Electoral Committee)
 Peotr Gamzagurdi (Socialist Revolutionary Party)/Council of peasant deputies
 Lev Gromashevskiy (Bolsheviks)
 Vladimir Drizo (Socialist Revolutionary Party)/Council of peasant deputies
 Vladimir Kozhuro (Bolsheviks)
 Nikolai Krivoshein (Bolsheviks)
 Kārlis Landers (Bolsheviks)
 Ivan Nesterov (Socialist Revolutionary Party)/Council of peasant deputies
 Vladimir Selezneov (Bolsheviks)
 Andrei Taganov (Bolsheviks)
 Vasiliy Freiman (Bolsheviks)
 Nikodim Schlegel (Bolsheviks)
 Osip Balai (Socialist Revolutionary Party)/Council of peasant deputies

Mogilev

 Anatoliy Buslov (Socialist Revolutionary Party)/Council of peasant deputies
 Paramon Voronov (Socialist Revolutionary Party)/Council of peasant deputies
 Yegor Zakrevskiy (Socialist Revolutionary Party)/Council of peasant deputies
 Mikhail Zasorin (Socialist Revolutionary Party)/Council of peasant deputies
 Ilya Kovarskiy (Socialist Revolutionary Party)/Council of peasant deputies
 Yaakov Mazeh (Jewish National Committee)
 Ivan Maleyev (Socialist Revolutionary Party)/Council of peasant deputies
 Stepan Malyshitskiy (Socialist Revolutionary Party)/Council of peasant deputies
 S. Ansky (Socialist Revolutionary Party)/Council of peasant deputies
 Lukian Khrisanenkov (Socialist Revolutionary Party)/Council of peasant deputies
 Aleksandr Tsvetayev (Socialist Revolutionary Party)/Council of peasant deputies
 Roman Shishayev (Socialist Revolutionary Party)/Council of peasant deputies
 Terentiy Vasilevskiy (Socialist Revolutionary Party)/Council of peasant deputies
 Grigoriy Leplevskiy (Bolsheviks)
 Naphtali Friedman (Jewish National Committee)
 Lazar Kaganovich (Bolsheviks)

Moscow

 Vladimir Baryshnikov (Bolsheviks)
 Vasiliy Bykov (Socialist Revolutionary Party)
 Pavel Dolgorukov (National Freedom)
 Nikolai Meshcheryakov (Bolsheviks-Internationalists)
 Osip Minor (Socialist Revolutionary Party)
 Viktor Nogin (Bolsheviks)
 Vladimir Pavlov (Socialist Revolutionary Party)
 Timofei Sapronov (Bolsheviks-Internationalists)
 Aleksandr Smirnov (Bolsheviks-Internationalists)
 Ivan Kokushkin (Bolsheviks)

Moscow–Capital

 Nikolay Astrov (National Freedom)
 Nikolai Bukharin (Bolsheviks-Internationalists)
 Yefim Ignatov (Bolsheviks-Internationalists)
 Fyodor Kokoshkin (National Freedom)
 Vasily Maklakov (National Freedom)
 Pavel Novgorodtsev (National Freedom)
 Pyotr Smidovich (Bolsheviks-Internationalists)
 Ivan Skvortsov-Stepanov (Bolsheviks-Internationalists)
 Yemelyan Yaroslavsky (Bolsheviks-Internationalists)

Nizhniy Novgorod

 Dmitriy Danilov (Bolsheviks)
 Mikhail Kutuzov (Socialist Revolutionary Party)/Council of peasant deputies
 Andrei Lukyanov (Socialist Revolutionary Party)/Council of peasant deputies
 Dmitriy Rakov (Socialist Revolutionary Party)/Council of peasant deputies
 Ivan Romanov (Bolsheviks)
 Mikhail Sumgin (Socialist Revolutionary Party)/Council of peasant deputies
 Dmitriy Tiurikov (Socialist Revolutionary Party)/Council of peasant deputies
 Mikhail Fokeyev (Socialist Revolutionary Party)/Council of peasant deputies
 Archepiscope Sergius (Group of Christian Unity)

Novgorod

 Grigoriy Valentinov (Bolsheviks)
 Aleksandr Glukovskiy (Socialist Revolutionary Party)
 Dmitriy Yermakov (Bolsheviks)
 Pavel Kobiakov (Socialist Revolutionary Party)
 Vasiliy Leontyev (Socialist Revolutionary Party)
 Ilya Pashin (Bolsheviks)
 Nikolai Sokolov (Socialist Revolutionary Party)
 Leon Trotsky (Bolsheviks)
 Moisei Uritsky (Bolsheviks)

Priamur

 Aleksandr Alekseyevskiy (Socialist Revolutionary Party)
 Vladimir Vykhristov Council of peasant deputies
 Nikolai Kozhevnikov (Amur and Ussuriisk Cossacks)
 Mikhail Mandrikov Council of peasant deputies
 Arnolds Neibuts (Bolsheviks)
 Valerian Petrov Council of peasant deputies
 Feodor Sorokin Council of peasant deputies

Olonets

 Andrei Matveyev Congress of peasant deputies
 Matvei Shishkin Congress of peasant deputies

Orenburg

 Gabdrauf Bogdanov (Orenburg Cossacks)
 Alexander Dutov (Orenburg Cossacks)
 Aleksandr Korosteleov (Bolsheviks)
 Aleksandr Krivoscheokov (Orenburg Cossacks)
 Sharif Manatov (Bashkir Federation)
 Viacheslav Matushkin (Orenburg Cossacks)
 Mikhail Polyakov (Congress of Socialist Revolutionary Party and peasant deputies)
 Ivan Sorokin (Congress of Socialist Revolutionary Party and peasant deputies)
 Gabul-Akhad Fakhretdinov (Bashkir Federation)
 Samuil Zwilling (Bolsheviks)
 Sergei Chutskayev (Bolsheviks)
 Yunus Bikbov (Bashkir Federation)
 Aleksandr Miakutin (Orenburg Cossacks)

Oryol

 Nikifor Andreyev (Bolsheviks)
 Feofan Bukin (Socialist Revolutionary Party)/Council of peasant deputies
 Vladimir Vladykin (Socialist Revolutionary Party)/Council of peasant deputies
 Sergei Volodin (Socialist Revolutionary Party)/Council of peasant deputies
 Ivan Volnov (Socialist Revolutionary Party)/Council of peasant deputies
 Sergei Goncharov (Socialist Revolutionary Party)/Council of peasant deputies
 Mikhail Ivanov (Bolsheviks)
 Nikolai Kuznetsov (Bolsheviks)
 Semeon Maslov (Socialist Revolutionary Party)/Council of peasant deputies
 Olga Matveevskaya (Socialist Revolutionary Party)/Council of peasant deputies
 Ignatiy Fokin (Bolsheviks)
 Nikolai Khodotov (Socialist Revolutionary Party)/Council of peasant deputies

Penza

 Nikolai Avksentiev (Socialist Revolutionary Party)
 Mikhail Boldov (Socialist Revolutionary Party)
 Abram Gots (Socialist Revolutionary Party)
 Vasiliy Konogov (Socialist Revolutionary Party)
 Nikolai Kostin (Socialist Revolutionary Party)
 Aleksandr Levtonov (Socialist Revolutionary Party)
 Ivan Prokhorov (Socialist Revolutionary Party)
 Florian Fedorovich (Socialist Revolutionary Party)
 Iosif Tsyngovatov (Socialist Revolutionary Party)

Perm

 Nikolay Alekseyev (Socialist Revolutionary Party)/Council of peasant deputies
 Alexander Beloborodov (Bolsheviks)
 Sergei Bondarev (Socialist Revolutionary Party)/Council of peasant deputies
 Aleksandr Varushkin (Socialist Revolutionary Party)/Council of peasant deputies
 Lev Gerstein (Socialist Revolutionary Party)/Council of peasant deputies
 Leonid Zateischikov (Socialist Revolutionary Party)/Council of peasant deputies
 Nikolai Zdobnov (Socialist Revolutionary Party)/Council of peasant deputies
 Aron Zisman (Socialist Revolutionary Party)/Council of peasant deputies
 Flegont Kabakov (Socialist Revolutionary Party)/Council of peasant deputies
 Nikolay Krestinsky (Bolsheviks)
 Lev Krol (National Freedom)
 Afanasiy Kuznetsov (Socialist Revolutionary Party)/Council of peasant deputies
 Mikhail Sigov (Socialist Revolutionary Party)/Council of peasant deputies
 Lev Sosnovsky (Bolsheviks)
 Stepan Tarabukin (Socialist Revolutionary Party)/Council of peasant deputies
 Fatikh Tukhvatullin (Bashkir-Tatar Group)
 Vladimir Andronnikov (Bolsheviks)
 Vladimir Sumarokov (National Freedom)

Petrograd

 Semeon Voskov (Bolsheviks)
 Aleksandr Vysotskiy (Socialist Revolutionary Party)/Council of peasant deputies
 Vladimir Zenzinov (Socialist Revolutionary Party)/Council of peasant deputies
 Vladimir Nabokov (National Freedom)
 Boris Nimvitskiy (Bolsheviks)
 Boris Pozern (Bolsheviks)
 Fyodor Raskolnikov (Bolsheviks)
 Alexander Shotman (Bolsheviks)
 Sergei Cherepanov Central Committee Military Organization

Petrograd-Capital

 Maxim Vinaver (National Freedom)
 Grigory Yevdokimov Central Committee
 Grigory Zinoviev Central Committee
 Mikhail Kalinin Central Committee
 Boris Kamkov (Socialist Revolutionary Party)
 Nikolai Kutler (National Freedom)
 Pavel Milyukov (National Freedom)
 Feodor Rodichev (National Freedom)
 Joseph Stalin Central Committee
 Józef Unszlicht Central Committee
 Grigoriy Schreider (Socialist Revolutionary Party)

Podolia

 Dmytro Antonovych (Ukrainian Socialist Revolutionary Party, Social-Democrats, Ukrainian Peasant Union)
 Joachim Stefan Bartoszewicz (Polish Regional list)
 Panteleimon Blonskyi (Ukrainian Socialist Revolutionary Party, Social-Democrats, Ukrainian Peasant Union)
 Trokhym Verkhola (Ukrainian Socialist Revolutionary Party, Social-Democrats, Ukrainian Peasant Union)
 Petro Vidybida (Ukrainian Socialist Revolutionary Party, Social-Democrats, Ukrainian Peasant Union)
 Anton Herasymenko (Ukrainian Socialist Revolutionary Party, Social-Democrats, Ukrainian Peasant Union)
 Danylo Holovchuk (Ukrainian Socialist Revolutionary Party, Social-Democrats, Ukrainian Peasant Union)
 Nychypir Hryhoryev (Ukrainian Socialist Revolutionary Party, Social-Democrats, Ukrainian Peasant Union)
 Volodymyr Dudych (Ukrainian Socialist Revolutionary Party, Social-Democrats, Ukrainian Peasant Union)
 Avksentiy Dyachuk (Ukrainian Socialist Revolutionary Party, Social-Democrats, Ukrainian Peasant Union)
 Dmytro Isayevych (Ukrainian Socialist Revolutionary Party, Social-Democrats, Ukrainian Peasant Union)
 Mykola Lytvytskyi (Ukrainian Socialist Revolutionary Party, Social-Democrats, Ukrainian Peasant Union)
 Mykola Liubynsky (Ukrainian Socialist Revolutionary Party, Social-Democrats, Ukrainian Peasant Union)
 Volodymyr Machushenko (Ukrainian Socialist Revolutionary Party, Social-Democrats, Ukrainian Peasant Union)
 Ivan Mykolaichuk (Ukrainian Socialist Revolutionary Party, Social-Democrats, Ukrainian Peasant Union)
 Petro Tkach (Ukrainian Socialist Revolutionary Party, Social-Democrats, Ukrainian Peasant Union)
 Metodiy Shevchenko (Ukrainian Socialist Revolutionary Party, Social-Democrats, Ukrainian Peasant Union)
 Ioanykiy Shymonovych (Ukrainian Socialist Revolutionary Party, Social-Democrats, Ukrainian Peasant Union)

Poltava

 Nestor Galagan (Ukrainian Socialist Revolutionary Party, Ukrainian Peasant Union)
 Mykhailo Ivchenko (Ukrainian Socialist Revolutionary Party, Ukrainian Peasant Union)
 Levko Kovaliv (Ukrainian Socialist Revolutionary Party and Socialist Revolutionary Party)
 Mykola Kovalevskyi (Ukrainian Socialist Revolutionary Party, Ukrainian Peasant Union)
 Danylo Kovalenko (Ukrainian Socialist Revolutionary Party, Ukrainian Peasant Union)
 Yakiv Kulychenko (Ukrainian Socialist Revolutionary Party, Ukrainian Peasant Union)
 Nazar Petrenko (Ukrainian Socialist Revolutionary Party, Ukrainian Peasant Union)
 Mykhailo Poloz (Ukrainian Socialist Revolutionary Party and Socialist Revolutionary Party)
 Oleksandr Polotskyi (Ukrainian Socialist Revolutionary Party, Ukrainian Peasant Union)
 Tymish Semeniaha (Ukrainian Socialist Revolutionary Party, Ukrainian Peasant Union)
 Yakiv Stenka (Ukrainian Socialist Revolutionary Party, Ukrainian Peasant Union)
 Arkadiy Stepanenko (Ukrainian Socialist Revolutionary Party, Ukrainian Peasant Union)
 Yevgeniy Terletskiy (Ukrainian Socialist Revolutionary Party and Socialist Revolutionary Party)
 Oleksandr Yanko (Ukrainian Socialist Revolutionary Party, Ukrainian Peasant Union)
 Peotr Smirnov (Bolsheviks)

Pskov

 Leonid Bekleshov (Socialist Revolutionary Party)/Council of peasant deputies
 Adolph Joffe (Bolsheviks)
 Nikolai Olkhin (Socialist Revolutionary Party)/Council of peasant deputies
 Georgiy Pokrovskiy (Socialist Revolutionary Party)
 Mikhail Safonov (Socialist Revolutionary Party)/Council of peasant deputies
 Vasiliy Utkin (Socialist Revolutionary Party)/Council of peasant deputies
 Mikhail Usharnov (Bolsheviks)
 Andrei Okhtin (Bolsheviks)

Ryazan

 Gerasim Barinov (Socialist Revolutionary Party)/Council of peasant deputies
 Mikhail Gendelman (Socialist Revolutionary Party)/Council of peasant deputies
 Nikolay Govorov (Socialist Revolutionary Party)/Council of peasant deputies
 Ivan Gorshkov (Bolsheviks)
 Valerian Osinsky (Bolsheviks)
 Feodor Pavlov (Socialist Revolutionary Party)/Council of peasant deputies
 Semyon Sereda (Bolsheviks)
 Yefim Sorokin (Socialist Revolutionary Party)/Council of peasant deputies
 Trofim Sukharev (Socialist Revolutionary Party)/Council of peasant deputies
 Mikhail Voronkov (Bolsheviks)

Samara

 Vasiliy Arkhangelskiy (Socialist Revolutionary Party)/Council of peasant deputies
 Aleksandr Bashkirov (Socialist Revolutionary Party)/Council of peasant deputies
 Feodor Belozeorov (Socialist Revolutionary Party)/Council of peasant deputies
 Yakov Bogoslovov (Socialist Revolutionary Party)/Council of peasant deputies
 Ivan Bruschwit (Socialist Revolutionary Party)/Council of peasant deputies
 Yakov Dedusenko (Socialist Revolutionary Party)/Council of peasant deputies
 Aleksandr Yelyashevich (Socialist Revolutionary Party)/Council of peasant deputies
 Prokopiy Klimushkin (Socialist Revolutionary Party)/Council of peasant deputies
 Valerian Kuybyshev (Bolsheviks)
 Egor Lazarev Council of peasant deputies
 Aleksandr Maslennikov (Bolsheviks)
 Pavel Maslov (Socialist Revolutionary Party)/Council of peasant deputies
 Shakir Mukhamediyarov (Muslim "Shura")
 Makhmud Tukhtarov (Muslim "Shura")
 Boris Fortunatov (Socialist Revolutionary Party)/Council of peasant deputies
 Vasiliy Chupakhin (Socialist Revolutionary Party)/Council of peasant deputies
 Veniamin Yermoschenko (Bolsheviks)

Samarkand

 Tashpulat Abdukhalilov (Muslim organizations)
 Mahmudkhodja Behbudiy (Muslim organizations)
 Sadri Maksudi Arsal (Muslim organizations)
 Piri-Kuli Mursalov (Muslim organizations)
 Abdurakhman Farkhatov (Muslim organizations)

Saratov

 Naum Bykhovskiy (Socialist Revolutionary Party)/Council of peasant deputies
 Mikhail Vasilyev-Yuzhin (Bolsheviks)
 Mikhail Zatonskiy (Socialist Revolutionary Party)/Council of peasant deputies
 Alexander Kerensky (Socialist Revolutionary Party)/Council of peasant deputies
 Vladimir Milyutin (Bolsheviks)
 Aleksandr Minin (Socialist Revolutionary Party)/Council of peasant deputies
 Pavel Panchurin (Socialist Revolutionary Party)/Council of peasant deputies
 Nikolai Rakitnikov (Socialist Revolutionary Party)/Council of peasant deputies
 Aleksei Ustinov (Socialist Revolutionary Party)/Council of peasant deputies
 Boris Chernenkov (Socialist Revolutionary Party)/Council of peasant deputies
 Vladimir Antonov-Saratovsky (Bolsheviks)
 Ivan Kotov (Socialist Revolutionary Party)/Council of peasant deputies
 Sergei Minin (Bolsheviks)
 Grigoriy Ulyanov (Socialist Revolutionary Party)/Council of peasant deputies
 Aleksandr Chernavin (Socialist Revolutionary Party)/Council of peasant deputies

Semirechensk

 Sadyk Amanzholov (Alash and Cossacks)
 Ibraim Dzhainakov (Alash and Cossacks)
 Dior Saurambaev (Alash and Cossacks)
 Mukhamedzhan Tynyshpaev (Socialists bloc)
 Peotr Shebalin (Socialists)
 Stepan Shendrikov (Alash and Cossacks)

Simbirsk

 Valentin Almazov (Socialist Revolutionary Party)/Peasant Congress
 Klemetiy Vorobyeov (Socialist Revolutionary Party)/Peasant Congress
 Dmitriy Gavronskiy (Socialist Revolutionary Party)/Peasant Congress
 Pavel Moshkin (Socialist Revolutionary Party)/Peasant Congress
 Dmitriy Petrov (Socialist Revolutionary Party)/Peasant Congress
 Kirill Pochekuyev (Socialist Revolutionary Party)/Peasant Congress
 Yakov Sverdlov (Bolsheviks)
 Germogen Titov (Socialist Revolutionary Party)/Peasant Congress
 Əhməd Salikov (Muslim Party "Shura")

Smolensk

 Andrei Argunov (Socialist Revolutionary Party)/Council of peasant deputies
 Stanisław Bobiński (Bolsheviks)
 Mikhail Yegorov (Socialist Revolutionary Party)/Council of peasant deputies
 Semeon Ivanov (Bolsheviks)
 Georgiy Kutuzov (Socialist Revolutionary Party)/Council of peasant deputies
 Julian Leszczyński (Bolsheviks)
 Anatoly Lunacharsky (Bolsheviks)
 Viktor Podvitskiy (Socialist Revolutionary Party)/Council of peasant deputies
 Mikhail Pokrovsky (Bolsheviks)
 Mikhail Remizov (Bolsheviks)
 Gerasim Ovsianik (Bolsheviks)

Stavropol

 Mikhail Bocharnikov (Socialist Revolutionary Party)/Council of peasant deputies
 Filipp Garnitskiy (Socialist Revolutionary Party)/Council of peasant deputies
 Aleksandr Gutorov (Socialist Revolutionary Party)/Council of peasant deputies
 Yevgeniy Dementyev (Socialist Revolutionary Party)/Council of peasant deputies
 Grigoriy Yemelyanov (Socialist Revolutionary Party)/Council of peasant deputies
 Fedot Onipko (Socialist Revolutionary Party)/Council of peasant deputies

Tambov

 Semeon Batmanov (Socialist Revolutionary Party)/Council of peasant deputies
 Nikolay Babynin (Socialist Revolutionary Party)/Council of peasant deputies
 Mikhail Volskiy (Socialist Revolutionary Party)/Council of peasant deputies
 Peotr Ilyin (Socialist Revolutionary Party)/Council of peasant deputies
 Vasiliy Kiseleov (Socialist Revolutionary Party)/Council of peasant deputies
 Georgiy Kondratenkov (Socialist Revolutionary Party)/Council of peasant deputies
 Yefrem Merkulov (Socialist Revolutionary Party)/Council of peasant deputies
 Boris Moiseyev (Bolsheviks)
 Ivan Nabatov (Socialist Revolutionary Party)/Council of peasant deputies
 Feodor Nemtinov (Socialist Revolutionary Party)/Council of peasant deputies
 Adrian Odintsov (Socialist Revolutionary Party)/Council of peasant deputies
 Mikhail Olminsky (Bolsheviks)
 Ivan Riabov (Socialist Revolutionary Party)/Council of peasant deputies
 Anastasia Sletova-Chernova (Socialist Revolutionary Party)/Council of peasant deputies
 Viktor Chernov (Socialist Revolutionary Party)/Council of peasant deputies
 Feodor Chernysheov (Socialist Revolutionary Party)/Council of peasant deputies
 Alexander Schlichter (Bolsheviks)

Taurida

 Nikolay Aliasov (Socialist Revolutionary Party)/Council of peasant deputies
 Vasiliy Bakuta (Socialist Revolutionary Party)/Council of peasant deputies
 Nikolay Bogdanov (National Freedom)
 Peotr Bondar (Socialist Revolutionary Party)/Council of peasant deputies
 Samuil Zak (Socialist Revolutionary Party)/Council of peasant deputies
 Sergei Nikonov (Socialist Revolutionary Party)/Council of peasant deputies
 Ivan Popov (Socialist Revolutionary Party)/Council of peasant deputies
 Cafer Seydamet (Provisional Crimean Muslim Executive Committee)
 Peotr Tolstov (Socialist Revolutionary Party)/Council of peasant deputies
 Mykola Saltan (Ukrainian Social Revolutionary Party)

Tobolsk

 Stepan Gultiayev (Socialist Revolutionary Party)/Congress of peasant deputies
 Kuzma Yevdokimov (Socialist Revolutionary Party)/Congress of peasant deputies
 Aleksandr Ivanitskiy-Vasilenko (Socialist Revolutionary Party)/Congress of peasant deputies
 Dmitriy Kotelnikov (Socialist Revolutionary Party)/Congress of peasant deputies
 Aleksandr Krasnousov (Socialist Revolutionary Party)/Congress of peasant deputies
 Iosif Mikhailov (Socialist Revolutionary Party)/Congress of peasant deputies
 Aleksei Mukhin (Socialist Revolutionary Party)/Congress of peasant deputies
 Aleksei Sukhanov (National-Socialists)/Congress of peasant deputies
 Pavel Sukhanov (Socialist Revolutionary Party)/Congress of peasant deputies
 Trofim Barantsev (Socialist Revolutionary Party)/Congress of peasant deputies

Tomsk

 Loggin Grigoryev (Socialist Revolutionary Party)
 Mikhail Lindberg (Socialist Revolutionary Party)
 Boris Markov (Socialist Revolutionary Party)
 Gavriil Markov (Socialist Revolutionary Party)
 Pavel Mikhailov (Socialist Revolutionary Party)
 Mikhail Omelkov (Socialist Revolutionary Party)
 Arseniy Lisiyenko (Socialist Revolutionary Party)
 Ivan Smirnov (Bolsheviks)
 Vasiliy Sukhomlyn (Socialist Revolutionary Party)
 Innokentiy Shisharin (Socialist Revolutionary Party)

Transbaikal

 Mikhail Bogdanov (Burnatskom)
 Apollon Kruglikov (Socialist Revolutionary Party)
 Nikolai Pumpianskiy (Socialist Revolutionary Party)
 Aleksandr Dobromyslov (Socialist Revolutionary Party)
 Khrisanf Simakov (Socialist Revolutionary Party)
 Sergey Taskin (Cossacks)
 Anton Flegontov (Socialist Revolutionary Party)

Transcaucasus

 Hasan bey Aghayev (Musavat)/Muslin national committee
 Kosta Ambartsumian (Dashnaktsutyun)
 Ibrahim Gaydarov Muslim Socialist Bloc
 Evgeni Gegechkori (Mensheviks)
 Mammad Yusif Jafarov (Musavat)/Muslin national committee
 Noe Zhordania (Mensheviks)
 Hakob Zavriev (Dashnaktsutyun)
 Stepan Zorian (Dashnaktsutyun)
 Arshak Zurabov (Mensheviks)
 Elixan Qantemir Muslim Socialist Bloc
 Valerian Lunkevich (Socialist Revolutionary Party)
 Mikayel Varandian (Dashnaktsutyun)
 Hamo Ohanjanyan (Dashnaktsutyun)
 Isidore Ramishvili (Mensheviks)
 Noe Ramishvili (Mensheviks)
 Mahammad Amin Rasulzade (Musavat)/Muslin national committee
 Matvey Skobelev (Mensheviks)
 Sultan Məcid Qənizadə (Muslims of Russia)
 Khosrov bey Sultanov (Musavat)/Muslin national committee
 Alimardan bey Topchubashov (Musavat)/Muslin national committee
 Nasib bey Yusifbeyli (Musavat)/Muslin national committee
 Irakli Tsereteli (Mensheviks)
 Nikolay Chkheidze (Mensheviks)
 Akaki Chkhenkeli (Mensheviks)
 Stepan Shaumian (Bolsheviks)
 Avetis Shakhatunian (Dashnaktsutyun)
 Levon Atabekian (Socialist Revolutionary Party)
 Əsədulla Axundov (Mensheviks-Gummet)
 Iosif Bekzadian (Mensheviks)
 Koriun Gazazian (Dashnaktsutyun)
 Grigol Giorgadze (Mensheviks)
 Vladimir Dzhibladze (Mensheviks)
 Aleksandr Lomtatidze (Mensheviks)
 Qazı Əhməd Məhəmmədbəyov (Musavat)/Muslin national committee
 Aslan bey Safikurdski Muslim Socialist Bloc
 Mikhail Smirnov (Mensheviks)
 Hovhannes Kajaznuni (Dashnaktsutyun)
 Sirakan Tigranyan (Dashnaktsutyun)
 Sargis Araratyan (Dashnaktsutyun)
 Aslan bey Gardashov (Musavat)/Muslin national committee
 Mustafa Mahmudov (Musavat)/Muslin national committee
 Mir Hidayət Seyidov (Musavat)/Muslin national committee

Tula

 Boris Arvatov (Socialist Revolutionary Party)/Council of peasant and military-peasant deputies
 Vissarion Gurevich (Socialist Revolutionary Party)/Council of peasant and military-peasant deputies
 Grigory Kaminsky Revolutionary Social-Democratic blocs
 Aleksandr Kaul Revolutionary Social-Democratic blocs
 Vasiliy Medvedev (Socialist Revolutionary Party)/Council of peasant and military-peasant deputies
 Grigoriy Nearonov (Socialist Revolutionary Party)/Council of peasant and military-peasant deputies
 Varvara Yakovleva (Bolsheviks)
 Sergei Kolesnikov (Revolutionary social-democrats Bolsheviks)

Turgai

 Ahmet Baitursynuly (Alash)
 Akhmet Beremzhanov (Alash)
 Sagydyk Doszhanov (Alash)
 Iosif Pakhomov (Socialist Revolutionary Party)/Council of peasant deputies
 Abdulla Temirov (Alash)

Tver

 Aleksandr Arosev (Bolsheviks)
 Aleksandr Vagzhanov (Bolsheviks)
 Vladimir Vol'skii (Socialist Revolutionary Party)/Council of peasant deputies
 Andrei Medov (Bolsheviks)
 Grigory Sokolnikov (Bolsheviks)
 Grigoriy Sokolnikov (Bolsheviks)
 Konstantin Tikhomirov (Socialist Revolutionary Party)/Council of peasant deputies
 Vasily Schmidt (Bolsheviks)
 Vasiliy Tolmachevskiy (Socialist Revolutionary Party)/Council of peasant deputies
 Dmitriy Bulatov (Bolsheviks)

Ufa

 Mukhiayetdin Akhmerov Council of peasant deputies
 Aleksandr Brilliantov (Socialist Revolutionary Party)/Council of peasant deputies
 Zeki Velidi Togan (Bashkirs-Federalists)
 Ğalimcan İbrahimof Council of peasant deputies
 Gizatulla Ilyasov Council of peasant deputies
 Akhmetdin Mukhametdinov Council of peasant deputies
 Nikolai Osintsev (Socialist Revolutionary Party)/Council of peasant deputies
 Şərif Sönçələyev Council of peasant deputies
 Gumer Teregulov (Muslim National Council)
 Vladimir Trutovskiy (Socialist Revolutionary Party)/Council of peasant deputies
 Vasiliy Filatov (Socialist Revolutionary Party)/Council of peasant deputies
 Isaac Steinberg (Socialist Revolutionary Party)/Council of peasant deputies
 Gumer Kuvatov (Bashkirs-Federalists)

Ural

 Gubaidulla Alibekov (Kirghiz Committee)
 Nicholas A. Borodin (Cossacks)
 Grigoriy Volosov (Socialist Revolutionary Party)/Council of peasant deputies
 Jahansha Dosmuxamedov (Kirghiz Committee)
 Xalel Dosmuxamedov (Kirghiz Committee)
 Nurgali Ipmagambetov (Kirghiz Committee)
 Salimgirey Karatleuv (Kirghiz Committee)

Viatka

 Dmitriy Biriukov (Socialist Revolutionary Party)/Council of peasant deputies
 Vasiliy Buzanov (Socialist Revolutionary Party)/Congress of peasant deputies
 Panteleimon Vikhliayev (Socialist Revolutionary Party)/Congress of peasant deputies
 Nikolay Yevseyev (Socialist Revolutionary Party)/Congress of peasant deputies
 Lavr Yefremov (Socialist Revolutionary Party)/Congress of peasant deputies
 Boris Zbarskiy (Socialist Revolutionary Party)/Congress of peasant deputies
 Aleksandr Kropotov (Socialist Revolutionary Party)/Congress of peasant deputies
 Ivan Kuznetsov (Socialist Revolutionary Party)/Congress of peasant deputies
 Ivan Pastukhov (Bolsheviks)
 Ivan Popov (Bolsheviks)
 Peotr Salamatov (Socialist Revolutionary Party)/Congress of peasant deputies
 Aleksandrs Spunde (Bolsheviks)
 Nikolai Tchaikovsky (National Socialist and National Union of Cheremis)
 Konstantin Shulakov (Socialist Revolutionary Party)/Congress of peasant deputies
 Vasiliy Golovizin (Socialist Revolutionary Party)/Congress of peasant deputies
 Ivan Shvetsov (Bolsheviks)
 Sahib-Girey Yambaev (Muslim Congress)

Vitebsk

 Maksim Boldysh (Socialist Revolutionary Party)
 Andrei Bulat (Socialist Revolutionary Party)
 Aleksandr Gizetti (Socialist Revolutionary Party)
 Felix Dzerzhinsky (Bolsheviks)
 Lev Kamenev (Bolsheviks)
 Boris Pinson (Bolsheviks)
 Zalman Ryvkin (Bolsheviks)
 Sarkis Sarkisyants (Bolsheviks)
 Stefan Czeszejko-Sochacki (Bolsheviks)

Vladimir

 Nikolai Zhideleov (Bolsheviks)
 Aleksei Kiselyov (Bolsheviks)
 Georgy Oppokov (Bolsheviks)
 Isidor Lyubimov (Bolsheviks)
 Nikolai Makeyev (Socialist Revolutionary Party)/Congress of peasant deputies
 Valerian Naumov (Bolsheviks)
 Feodor Sokolov (Socialist Revolutionary Party)/Congress of peasant deputies
 Maria Spiridonova (Socialist Revolutionary Party)/Congress of peasant deputies
 Mikhail Frunze (Bolsheviks)

Vologda

 Mikhail Vetoshkin (Bolsheviks)
 Ivan Galkin (Socialist Revolutionary Party)/Council of peasant deputies
 Aleksandr Koriakin (Socialist Revolutionary Party)/Council of peasant deputies
 Sergei Maslov (Socialist Revolutionary Party)/Council of peasant deputies
 Nikolai Raschesayev (Socialist Revolutionary Party)/Council of peasant deputies
 Pitirim Sorokin (Socialist Revolutionary Party)/Council of peasant deputies
 Peotr Yuretskiy (Socialist Revolutionary Party)/Council of peasant deputies

Volyn

 Ivan Hedz (Ukrainian Social Revolutionary)/Council of peasant deputies
 Feodosiy Kobylchuk (Ukrainian Social Revolutionary)/Council of peasant deputies
 Kalenyk Koval (Ukrainian Social Revolutionary)/Council of peasant deputies
 Jan Lipkowski (Polish List)
 Trokhym Martsyniuk (Ukrainian Social Revolutionary)/Council of peasant deputies
 Dmytro Pavliuk (Ukrainian Social Revolutionary)/Council of peasant deputies
 Maksym Trots (Ukrainian Social Revolutionary)/Council of peasant deputies
 Markian Cheranovskyi (Ukrainian Social Revolutionary)/Council of peasant deputies

Voronezh

 Hilarion Antipin (Socialist Revolutionary Party)
 Arteom Blyzniuk (Socialist Revolutionary Party)
 Kost Bureviy (Socialist Revolutionary Party)
 Yakov Gladkikh (Socialist Revolutionary Party)
 German Zinin (Socialist Revolutionary Party)
 Matvei Kogan-Bernstein (Socialist Revolutionary Party)
 Ivan Mamkin (Socialist Revolutionary Party)
 Vladimir Nevsky (Bolsheviks and other internationalists)
 Nikolai Nikitin (Socialist Revolutionary Party)
 Nikolai Oganovskiy (Socialist Revolutionary Party)
 Sergei Postnikov (Socialist Revolutionary Party)
 Ivan Smirnov (Socialist Revolutionary Party)
 Konstantin Khrenovskiy (Socialist Revolutionary Party)
 Nikolai Kardashov (Bolsheviks and other internationalists)
 Maria Perveeva (Socialist Revolutionary Party)
 Aleksandr Ruttsen (National Freedom)

Yakutsk

 Gavriil Ksenofontov (Federalists Labour Union)
 Vasiliy Pankratov (Socialist Revolutionary Party)

Yaroslavl

 Feodor Bolshakov (Socialist Revolutionary Party)/Council of peasant deputies
 Mark Vishniak (Socialist Revolutionary Party)/Council of peasant deputies
 Vladimir Kilchevskiy (Socialist Revolutionary Party)/Council of peasant deputies
 Alexandra Kollontai (Bolsheviks-Internationlists)
 Alexei Rykov (Bolsheviks-Internationlists)
 Aleksandr Konovalov (National Freedom)

Yekaterinoslav

 Vasiliy Averin (Bolsheviks)/Bakhmut council of peasant deputies
 Serhiy Bachynskyi (Ukrainian Peasant Union, Spilka)
 Kliment Voroshilov (Bolsheviks)/Bakhmut council of peasant deputies
 Mykola Hvozdykivskyi (Zemlia i Volia)
 Oleh Azowsky (Ukrainian Peasant Union, Spilka)
 Kuzma Korzh (Ukrainian Peasant Union, Spilka)
 Ivan Lutovinov (Bolsheviks)/Council of peasant deputies
 Ivan Mytsiuk (Ukrainian Peasant Union, Spilka)
 Grigory Petrovsky (Bolsheviks)/Bakhmut council of peasant deputies
 Semen Popov (Zemlia i Volia)
 Oleksandr Radomskyi (Ukrainian Peasant Union, Spilka)
 Dmytro Rozenblium (Zemlia i Volia)
 Ivan Romanenko (Ukrainian Peasant Union, Spilka)
 Andriy Rosin (Ukrainian Peasant Union, Spilka)
 Oleksandr Socheva (Zemlia i Volia)
 Fedir Storubel (Ukrainian Peasant Union, Spilka)
 Vasyl Stromenko (Ukrainian Peasant Union, Spilka)
 Pavlo Surhai (Ukrainian Peasant Union, Spilka)

Yeniseysk

 Kuzma Gurov (Socialist Revolutionary Party)
 Yevgeniy Kolosov (Socialist Revolutionary Party)
 Aleksei Okulov (Bolsheviks)
 Aleksei Rogov (Bolsheviks)
 Nil Fomin (Socialist Revolutionary Party)
 Roberts Eidemanis (Socialist Revolutionary Party)

Unknown
 Kozma Burov
 Denis Inyrev

Mandates for military candidates

Romanian Front

 Vasiliy Abramov (Socialist Revolutionary Party)/Council of peasant deputies
 Vladimir Alekseyevskiy (Socialist Revolutionary Party)/Council of peasant deputies
 Vladimir Andrianov (Socialist Revolutionary Party)/Council of peasant deputies
 Nikolai Bocharnikov (Socialist Revolutionary Party)/Council of peasant deputies
 Arseniy Bylinkin (Socialist Revolutionary Party)/Council of peasant deputies
 Vasiliy Yerofeyev (Socialist Revolutionary Party)/Council of peasant deputies
 Peotr Kotlin (Socialist Revolutionary Party)/Council of peasant deputies
 Arkadiy Krakovetskiy (Socialist Revolutionary Party)/Council of peasant deputies
 Nikolai Krylenko (Bolsheviks)
 Ivan Lordkipanidze (Socialist Revolutionary Party)/Council of peasant deputies
 Sergei Markov (Socialist Revolutionary Party)/Council of peasant deputies
 Pavel Mostovenko (Bolsheviks)
 Symon Petliura (Ukrainian Socialist Organization)
 Viktor Pysnachevskyi (Ukrainian Socialist Organization)
 David Riazanov (Bolsheviks)
 Boris Solers (Bolsheviks)
 Arystarkh Ternychenko (Ukrainian Socialist Organization)
 Nikolai Shmeleov (Socialist Revolutionary Party)/Council of peasant deputies
 Yukhym Hryshchenko (Ukrainian Socialists united)
 Ilya Ilyinskiy (Socialist Revolutionary Party)/Council of peasant deputies

Northern Front

 Vladimir Antonov-Ovseenko (Bolsheviks)
 Aleksandr Vasilyev (Bolsheviks)
 Nikolai Ivanov (Socialist Revolutionary Party)/Council of peasant deputies
 Ivan Klochko (Ukrainian Socialist Revolutionary Party, national socialist organizations of Muslims)
 Viacheslav Kolerov (Socialist Revolutionary Party)/Council of peasant deputies
 Mikhail Likhach (Socialist Revolutionary Party)/Council of peasant deputies
 Sergei Medvedev (Bolsheviks)
 Semyon Nakhimson (Bolsheviks)
 Nikolai Podvoisky (Bolsheviks)
 Boris Rabinovich (Socialist Revolutionary Party)/Council of peasant deputies
 Alexander Sedyakin (Bolsheviks)
 Ephraim Sklyansky (Bolsheviks)
 Ivar Smilga (Bolsheviks)
 Pēteris Stučka (Bolsheviks)
 Vladimir Utgof (Socialist Revolutionary Party)/Council of peasant deputies
 Aron Sheinman (Bolsheviks)

Western Front

 Sergei Anuchin (Bolsheviks)
 Ivan Apeter (Bolsheviks)
 Isaak Baziak (Ukrainian Socialist Revolutionary Party, Social-Democrats)
 Mikhail Vasilyev (Bolsheviks)
 Franciszek Grzelszczak (Bolsheviks)
 Itsko Zetel-Zusman (Socialist Revolutionary Party)/Council of peasant deputies
 Ivan Ksenofontov (Bolsheviks)
 Vasiliy Kukonkov (Bolsheviks)
 Mykhailo Lebedynets (Ukrainian Socialist Revolutionary Party, Social-Democrats)
 Yefim Lysiakov (Bolsheviks)
 Viktor Morgenshtiern (Socialist Revolutionary Party)/Council of peasant deputies
 Alexander Miasnikian (Bolsheviks)
 Mikhail Nikolayev (Socialist Revolutionary Party)/Council of peasant deputies
 Nikolai Rogozinskiy (Bolsheviks)
 Nikolai Tikhmenev (Bolsheviks)
 Innokentiy Fedenev (Bolsheviks)
 Aleksandr Yakovlev (Bolsheviks)

Caucasus Front

 Alexei Badayev (Bolsheviks)
 Nikolay Berezov (Socialist Revolutionary Party)
 Dmitriy Donskoy (Socialist Revolutionary Party)
 Aleksandr Pyzhev (Socialist Revolutionary Party)
 Leon Tumanov (Socialist Revolutionary Party)
 Stepan Mikhailov (Socialist Revolutionary Party)

South-Western Front

 Savatiy Berezniak (Ukrainian Socialist Revolutionary Party)
 Feodor Danskiy (Socialist Revolutionary Party)/Council of peasant deputies
 Anton Detlaf (Socialist Revolutionary Party)/Council of peasant deputies
 Grigoriy Dikanskiy (Socialist Revolutionary Party)/Council of peasant deputies
 Mikhail Kokovikhin (Bolsheviks)
 Petro Kutsiak (Ukrainian Socialist Revolutionary Party)
 Mikhail Lashevich (Bolsheviks)
 Eduard Levenberg (Socialist Revolutionary Party)/Council of peasant deputies
 Nikolai Lischev (Socialist Revolutionary Party)/Council of peasant deputies
 Nikolai Marchenkov (Bolsheviks)
 Boris Moiseyenko (Socialist Revolutionary Party)/Council of peasant deputies
 Vladimir Nikotin (Socialist Revolutionary Party)/Council of peasant deputies
 Leonid Pyatakov (Bolsheviks)
 Elena Rozmirovich (Bolsheviks)
 Boris Sokoloff (Socialist Revolutionary Party)/Council of peasant deputies
 Dmitriy Surgucheov (Socialist Revolutionary Party)/Council of peasant deputies
 Alexander Troyanovsky (Mensheviks united)
 Peotr Trubacheov (Bolsheviks)
 Vasiliy Filippovskiy (Socialist Revolutionary Party)/Council of peasant deputies
 Grigoriy Chudnovskiy (Bolsheviks)
 Oleksandr Dolhov (Ukrainian Socialist Revolutionary Party)

Black Sea Fleet

 Ilya Fondaminsky (Socialist Revolutionary Party)

Baltic Sea Fleet

 Pavel Dybenko (Bolsheviks)
 Vladimir Lenin (Bolsheviks)

Further reading
 
L. Protasov All-Russian Constituent Assembly (Всероссийское учредительное собрание). Encyclopedia. Moscow, ROSSPEN, 2014. ISBN 9785824319217

References

External links
Members of the Russian Constituent Assembly (alphabetical list and short biographic information). hrono.ru

Russian Constituent Assembly